Fukuo or Fukuō are separate Japanese surnames. Notable people with either surname include:

, Japanese footballer
, Japanese voice actress

Japanese-language surnames